Malladihalli is a village in the taluk of Holalkere in the Chitradurga district in the Indian state of Karnataka.

References

External links
 http://Chitradurga.nic.in/

Villages in Chitradurga district